A Merry Little Christmas is a Christmas-themed extended play released by the American country music group Lady Antebellum, later known as Lady A, released on October 12, 2010. It was available for purchase only at the American discount department store chain Target. The EP has one original track, "On This Winter's Night", and a cover version of the Mariah Carey hit "All I Want for Christmas Is You". All six tracks are on the group's 2012 Christmas album, On This Winter's Night.

Track listing

Charts

Weekly charts

Year-end charts

References

Lady A EPs
2010 EPs
2010 Christmas albums
Capitol Records EPs
Albums produced by Paul Worley
Christmas albums by American artists
Country Christmas albums
Christmas EPs